Stimmel is a surname of German origin. Notable people with the surname include:

Archie Stimmel (1873–1958), American baseball player
Jeff Stimmel, American film director and producer

References

Surnames of German origin